Manakara-Atsimo is a district of Fitovinany in Madagascar. The main city is Manakara.

Communes
The district is further divided into 42 communes:

 Ambahatrazo
 Ambahive
 Ambalaroka
 Ambalavero
 Ambila
 Amboanjo
 Ambohitsara M
 Amborondra
 Ambotaka
 Ampasimanjeva
 Ampasimboraka
 Ampasipotsy
 Analavory
 Anorombato
 Anosiala
 Anteza
 Bekatra
 Fenomby
 Lokomby
 Mahabako
 Mahamaibe
 Manakara
 Mangatsiotra
 Marofarihy
 Mavorano
 Mitanty
 Mizilo Gara
 Nihaonana
 Onilahy
 Sahanambohitra
 Saharefo
 Sahasinaka
 Sakoana
 Sorombo
 Tataho
 Vatana
 Vinanitelo
 Vohilava
 Vohimanitra
 Vohimasina Nord
 Vohimasina Sud
 Vohimasy

Rivers

the Manakara River
the Faraony River

Infastructure
The district is crossed by the National Road 12, as well as the Fianarantsoa-Côte Est railway.

References 

Districts of Fitovinany